The 16th Airborne Division was an airborne infantry division of the British Territorial Army. It was first commanded by Major-General Roy Urquhart, and had its divisional headquarters in London.

It was raised in 1947, to compensate for the loss of the 1st Airborne Division, which had been disbanded in 1945 and the 6th Airborne Division which was to be disbanded in 1948. The number "16" was used in recognition of the two wartime airborne divisions.

The division had three parachute brigades, the 4th, 5th and the 6th, each with three Territorial battalions of the Parachute Regiment. The brigades were renumbered the 44th, 45th and 46th in 1950. Then in December 1955, the British Secretary of State for War in an announcement on the future of the Territorial Army, proposed cutting the Territorial Battalion, The Parachute Regiments by five. The reduction in strength led to the disbandment of the division in 1956, leaving the 44th Independent Parachute Group as the only British reserve parachute formation.

299 Parachute Squadron, Royal Engineers

Units pre-1950 

16th Airborne Divisional Signal Regiment (Middlesex Yeomanry), Royal Corps of Signals
16th Airborne Division Field Security Section, Intelligence Corps
North Somerset Yeomanry (Royal Armoured Corps)
16th Airborne Divisional (Lincoln) Independent Company
21st Special Air Service Regiment
16th Airborne Division Ordnance Field Park, Royal Army Ordnance Corps
16th Airborne Division Provost Company, Royal Military Police
4th Parachute Brigade
10th (County of London) Battalion, The Parachute Regiment
11th (Middlesex) Battalion, The Parachute Regiment
14th Battalion, The Parachute Regiment
5th Parachute Brigade
12th (Yorkshire) Battalion, The Parachute Regiment
17th (Durham Light Infantry) Battalion, The Parachute Regiment
18th (Warwickshire) Battalion, The Parachute Regiment
6th Parachute Brigade
13th (Lancashire) Battalion, Parachute Regiment
15th (Scottish) Battalion, Parachute Regiment
16th (Welsh) Battalion, Parachute Regiment
16th Airborne Division Royal Artillery
880 Forward Observation Battery, Royal Artillery
285th (Essex) Airborne Light Regiment, Royal Artillery
291st (4th London) Airborne Field Regiment, Royal Artillery
292nd (5th London) Airborne Field Regiment, Royal Artillery
629th (Cambridgeshire Regiment) Airborne Light Regiment, Royal Artillery
446th (Royal Welch) Airborne Light Anti-Aircraft Regiment, Royal Artillery
16th Airborne Division Royal Engineers
131st Airborne Engineer Regiment
16th Airborne Division Royal Army Medical Corps
4th Parachute Field Ambulance (44th Parachute Field Ambulance from 1950)
5th Parachute Field Ambulance (45th Parachute Field Ambulance from 1950)
6th Parachute Field Ambulance (46th Parachute Field Ambulance from 1950)
1 x Reserve Medical Section
16th Airborne Divisional Column Royal Army Service Corps
1560 Company RASC
1561 Company RASC
1562 Company RASC
16th Airborne Division Royal Electrical and Mechanical Engineers
4th Airborne Workshop REME (44th Airborne Workshop REME from 1950)
5th Airborne Workshop REME (45th Airborne Workshop REME from 1950)
6th Airborne Workshop REME (46th Airborne Workshop REME from 1950)

Commanders 
January 1947 Major-General Roy Urquhart
December 1948 Major-General Gerald Lathbury
October 1951 Major-General Geoffrey Bourne
1953 Major-General Francis Rome

References

Military units and formations established in 1947
Military units and formations disestablished in 1956
16
1947 establishments in the United Kingdom
1956 disestablishments in the United Kingdom